"Where I Stood" is the second single from singer-songwriter Missy Higgins' second album, On a Clear Night. The song was released to commercial radio on 25 June 2007. The single was released on 4 August 2007. It reached No. 10 on the Australian Recording Industry Association (ARIA) Charts. In a similar promotional scenario as her previous single "Steer", Higgins gave her fans the opportunity to purchase a signed single along with signed lyrics.

The song has been featured on several television shows including episode 4 of season 7 of Smallville, on the 9th episode in Season 4 of Grey's Anatomy the 5th episode in Season 5 of One Tree Hill, the 6th episode of season 3 of Friday Night Lights and the 12th episode of Season 5 of Ghost Whisperer. It was also featured on The Hills, Lipstick Jungle, NCIS, Weeds, Pretty Little Liars, and The Client List.

Track listing
 "Where I Stood" – 4:19
 "Stuff and Nonsense" – 3:32
 "Wrong Girl (Live at Triple J)" – 3:22
 "Beautiful Mind (Live at Centennial Park)" – 3:41

Music video

There are two videos for the song, one for Australia and one for the United States. The Australian video premiered at midnight (12am AEST) on 26 June 2007, via Higgins' MySpace page. The video was directed by Australian filmmakers Paul Goldman and Alice Bell, who were also responsible for Silverchair's "Straight Lines" video. The US video uses a more uptempo mix of the song which is also the version played on American radio stations, rather than the version that appears on the album. This version was directed by Steven Murashige. Both videos can be seen on Higgins' website.

Charts

Weekly charts

Year-end charts

Sales and certifications

Cover versions
A dance version of "Where I Stood" by The Fierce Collective Ft. Soraya Vivian first appeared on the Fierce Disco IV compilation (FIANCOMP18) in June 2010 on the UK Fierce Angel dance label. Followed by an EP release featuring remixes by The Fierce Collective, Sleazesisters, AXP Project and Digital 96. The track was available world-wide on all digital platforms from 8 November 2010.

Country singer LeAnn Rimes also covered this song on her 2013 album Spitfire.

References

2007 singles
Missy Higgins songs
Song recordings produced by Mitchell Froom
2007 songs
Eleven: A Music Company singles
Songs written by Missy Higgins